Ekspress-AM11 (meaning Express-AM11) is a Russian communications satellite. It belongs to the Russian Satellite Communications Company (RSCC) based in Moscow, Russia.

Satellite description 
The satellite has a total of 30 transponders, 26 C-band and 4 Ku-band, for the domestic coverage of the Russian Federation.

Launch 
Ekspress-AM11 was launched by Khrunichev State Research and Production Space Center, using a Proton-K / DM-02 launch vehicle. The launch took place at 23:00:00 UTC on 28 December 2003, from Site 200/39 at Baikonur Cosmodrome, Kazakhstan. Successfully deployed into geostationary transfer orbit (GTO), Ekspress-AM11 raised itself into an operational geostationary orbit using its apogee motor.

Mission 
The satellite can be received in Southeast Asia], Australia and the most part of Russia. Ekspress-AM11 was hit on 28 March 2006 by either a micrometeorite or a piece of space debris, which lead to instantaneous depressurization of the thermal control system fluid circuit, followed by a sudden outburst of the heat-carrying agent. This resulted in a significant disturbing moment generation followed by the spacecraft orientation loss and rotation. After regaining control, the satellite was put into a graveyard orbit.

References 

Ekspress satellites
Spacecraft launched in 2004
2004 in Russia
Satellites using the KAUR bus